Cloverdale is an unincorporated community in Tillamook County, Oregon, United States. For statistical purposes, the United States Census Bureau has defined Cloverdale as a census-designated place (CDP). The census definition of the area may not precisely correspond to local understanding of the area with the same name. The population was 242 at the 2000 census.

History
Cloverdale was founded and named by Charles Ray, who settled in Tillamook County around 1884 at the site that later became the town.  He later established a store, hotel, bank, and cheese factory. A post office was established in 1899.

Geography

Climate
This region experiences cool and dry summers and mild, very wet winters. According to the Köppen Climate Classification system, Cloverdale has a warm-summer Mediterranean climate, abbreviated Csb on climate maps.

Demographics

As of the census of 2000, there were 242 people, 93 households, and 70 families residing in the CDP.  The population density was 301.7 people per square mile (116.8/km2).  There were 106 housing units at an average density of 132.2 per square mile (51.2/km2).  The racial makeup of the CDP was 97.52% White, 0.41% African American, 1.24% Native American, and 0.83% from two or more races.

There were 93 households, out of which 26.9% had children under the age of 18 living with them, 61.3% were married couples living together, 7.5% had a female householder with no husband present, and 24.7% were non-families. 17.2% of all households were made up of individuals, and 7.5% had someone living alone who was 65 years of age or older.  The average household size was 2.60 and the average family size was 2.80.

In the CDP, the population was spread out, with 21.5% under the age of 18, 7.4% from 18 to 24, 22.3% from 25 to 44, 33.9% from 45 to 64, and 14.9% who were 65 years of age or older.  The median age was 44 years. For every 100 females, there were 98.4 males.  For every 100 females age 18 and over, there were 93.9 males.

The median income for a household in the CDP was $50,568, and the median income for a family was $52,386. Males had a median income of $19,107 versus $18,125 for females. The per capita income for the CDP was $17,325.  None of the families and 6.6% of the population were living below the poverty line, including no under eighteens and 21.4% of those over 64.

References

Unincorporated communities in Tillamook County, Oregon
Census-designated places in Oregon
1899 establishments in Oregon
Populated places established in 1899
Census-designated places in Tillamook County, Oregon
Unincorporated communities in Oregon